The 1982 Kansas Jayhawks football team represented the University of Kansas in the Big Eight Conference during the 1982 NCAA Division I-A football season. In their eighth and final season under head coach Don Fambrough, the Jayhawks compiled a 2–7–2 record (1–5–1 against conference opponents), finished in seventh place in the conference, and were outscored by opponents by a combined total of 276 to 150. They played their home games at Memorial Stadium in Lawrence, Kansas.

The team's statistical leaders included Frank Seurer with 1,625 passing yards, Dino Bell with 370 rushing yards, and Bob Johnson with 428 receiving yards. Tim Friess, Russ Bastin, Gary Coleman, and Paul Fairchild were the team captains.

Schedule

References

Kansas
Kansas Jayhawks football seasons
Kansas Jayhawks football